Mike Corey (born March 8, 1984) is an American former mixed martial artist. A professional from 2005 until 2014, he fought in the IFL and the World Series of Fighting.

Biography
A high-school wrestler, Corey joined the Marines and started MMA training while stationed in California, and won several Grapplers Quest tournaments.

Corey made his return , in which he had a clear-cut decision win, winning all three rounds.

Corey trained with Team Curran MMA in Crystal Lake, Illinois, and with fighters such as Jeff Curra, Pat Curran and Bart Palaszewski. He currently teaches in the west and southwest suburbs of Chicago.

Mike Corey also tutored Josh S.

Bellator Fighting Championships

World Series of Fighting
Corey faced Shane Kruchten at WSOF 9 on March 29, 2014. He won the fight via rear-naked choke submission in the second round.

Mixed martial arts record

|-
| Win
| align=center| 13–3–1
| Shane Kruchten 
| Submission (rear-naked choke)
| WSOF 9
| 
| align=center| 0
| align=center| 200:59
| Las Vegas, Nevada, United States
| 
|-
| Loss
| align=center| 12–3–1
| Daniel Mason-Straus
| Decision (unanimous)
| Bellator 65
| 
| align=center| 0
| align=center| 10:00
| Atlantic City, New Jersey, United States
| 
|-
| Win
| align=center| 12–2–1
| Ronnie Mann
| Decision (unanimous)
| Bellator 60
| 
| align=center| 0
| align=center| 5:00
| Hammond, Indiana, United States
| 
|-
| Draw
| align=center| 11–2–1
| Chris Horodecki
| Draw (majority)
| Bellator 57
| 
| align=center| 0
| align=center| 5:00
| Rama, Ontario, Canada
| 
|-
| Win
| align=center| 11–2
| Tom Ahrens
| Decision (unanimous)
| XFO 38
| 
| align=center| 0
| align=center| 5:00
| Woodstock, Illinois, United States
| 
|-
| Win
| align=center| 10–2
| David Castillo
| Submission (rear-naked choke)
| Raw Power: MMA
| 
| align=center| 0
| align=center| N/A
| Sanabis, Bahrain
| 
|-
| Win
| align=center| 9–2
| Jonathan Murphy
| Decision (unanimous)
| XFO 31
| 
| align=center| 0
| align=center| 5:00
| Island Lake, Illinois, United States
| 
|-
| Win
| align=center| 8–2
| Tyler Combs
| Submission (arm-triangle choke)
| XFO 27
| 
| align=center| 0
| align=center| 1:49
| Lakemoor, Illinois, United States
| 
|-
| Win
| align=center| 7–2
| Dwayne Shelton
| TKO
| UWC: Invasion
| 
| align=center| 0
| align=center| 0:43
| Fairfax, Virginia, United States
| 
|-
| Loss
| align=center| 6–2
| Shad Lierley
| Decision (split)
| IFL: Moline
| 
| align=center| 0
| align=center| 4:00
| Moline, Illinois, United States
| 
|-
| Win
| align=center| 6–1
| Greg LaJoye
| Submission (triangle choke)
| ISCF: Invasion
| 
| align=center| 0
| align=center| 1:27
| Kennesaw, Georgia, United States
| 
|-
| Win
| align=center| 5–1
| Ryan Bixler
| Decision (unanimous)
| SC: Season's Beatings
| 	
| align=center| 0
| align=center| 5:00
| Springfield, Illinois, United States
| 
|-
| Win
| align=center| 4–1
| Brian Cobb
| Decision (unanimous)
| PF 2: Live MMA
| 
| align=center| 0
| align=center| 5:00
| Hollywood, California, United States
| 
|-
| Win
| align=center| 3–1
| Adrian Camacho
| Submission (kimura)
| RM 8: Reto Maximo 8
| 
| align=center| 0
| align=center| N/A
| Tijuana, Mexico
| 
|-
| Loss
| align=center| 2–1
| Cub Swanson
| TKO (cut)
| KOTC 61: Flash Point
| 
| align=center| 0
| align=center| 2:52
| San Jacinto, California, United States
| 
|-
| Win
| align=center| 2–0
| Nate Craig
| Submission (armbar)
| XCF 8: Xtreme Cage Fighter 0
| 
| align=center| 1
| align=center| 1:17
| California, United States
| 
|-
| Win
| align=center| 1-0
| Tony Garcia
| TKO (submission to strikes)
| CFC 2: Crown Fighting 0
| 
| align=center| 1
| align=center| 2:20
| Mexico
|

References

External links
Mike Corey Bio on IFL.TV

American male mixed martial artists
Mixed martial artists from Missouri
Featherweight mixed martial artists
Lightweight mixed martial artists
Living people
1984 births
People from O'Fallon, Missouri